Lloyd Eugene Rigler (May 3, 1915December 7, 2003) was an American businessman and philanthropist. As a businessman, he and a partner, Lawrence E. Deutsch, made Adolph's Meat Tenderizer a national brand. One of his notable philanthropic efforts was the establishment, in 1994, of the Classic Arts Showcase, a free, non-commercial television channel promoting the fine arts.

Early life and education 
Rigler was born in Lehr, North Dakota, to Frank and Jeannette Rigler, who ran a general store serving the farming community in the town of Wishek, North Dakota where the family lived. He had five siblings.

As a young man, he moved to live with relatives in Chicago and worked to save money to attend the University of Illinois, from which he graduated in 1939.

Career 
After graduating from college, Rigler moved to New York City to go into theater. To support himself, he worked as an interviewer for a marketing research agency and did the initial research for the Waring Blender. He later headed guest relations at RCA's exhibit introducing television at the New York World's Fair in 1940. After the fair, he trained as an RCA Victor Red Seal record promotion specialist – and Rigler came to Los Angeles a year later and became a Los Angeles salesman for Decca Records.

In 1942 during World War II, Rigler signed up for the U.S. Navy, but due to the fact that he had poor vision in his left eye, spent the war in San Pedro, California instead of overseas.

Lawrence E. Deutsch and Rigler met when Rigler worked in the food business and leased space from Deutsch. They went into business together in the mid-1940s.

In 1948, he and Deutsch, who died 1977, bought the Adolph's recipe and name from Adolph Rempp, a chef and restaurant owner in Santa Barbara, California. They later sold the Adolph's brand to Unilever. 

After the sale of their company, Deutsch and Rigler formed the Ledler Corporation, a venture capital firm.

Philanthropy 
When Rigler's partner, Deutsch, died in 1977, Rigler formed the philanthropic foundation called Lloyd E. Rigler–Lawrence E. Deutsch Foundation.

In May 1994, Rigler founded Classic Arts Showcase, which was based on the idea that for people who didn't have the money to see art and culture live, this television channel would provide a 24/7 experience for free. Prior to his death, he had funded the program to operate through at least 2022; the channel stated in 2020 that the foundation still has enough money to run the channel through at least 2040 with no additional outside funding sources. The signal of Classic Arts Showcase is not scrambled, so there is no authentication / access restriction. There are also no commercials.

In 1999, Rigler founded American Association of Single People, which was focused on political rights for single people.

Other philanthropic efforts:
 1980s: Joffrey Ballet – when it was located at the Los Angeles Music Center
 1990s: Egyptian Theatre – restoration
 American Cinematheque, Hollywood theaters
 Los Angeles Music Center – Founding Donor
 New York City Opera: Vice-Chairman of the Board of Directors
Carnegie Hall - refurbishing 
Los Angeles County Museum of Arts- donations

Death 
Rigler died of cancer on December 7, 2003 at age 88, at his home in Los Angeles.

See also 
 Rigler-Deutsch Index

References

External links 
 
 
 Guide to the Rigler–Deutsch Index (ARS.0105) at Stanford University

Activists from California
American company founders
American food industry businesspeople
American manufacturing businesspeople
American nonprofit executives
Businesspeople from Chicago
Businesspeople from Los Angeles
Businesspeople from North Dakota
20th-century American businesspeople
Philanthropists from California
1915 births
2003 deaths
People from Logan County, North Dakota
People from McIntosh County, North Dakota
Businesspeople from California
University of Illinois alumni
Philanthropists from Illinois
20th-century American philanthropists
Philanthropists from North Dakota